Blue Frontier is the debut album from the American country music trio The Remingtons, a vocal group composed of former Bread vocalist Jimmy Griffin, as well as former Cymarron members Richard Mainegra and Rick Yancey. Released in January 1992 on BNA Entertainment, the album produced three singles on the Billboard country singles charts between late 1991 and mid-1992. In order of release, these were "A Long Time Ago" at No. 10, "I Could Love You (With My Eyes Closed)" at No. 33, and "Two-Timin' Me" at No. 18.

Critical reception

Roch Parisien of Allmusic rated the album 3 out of 5 stars, saying that "There's nothing here that will move mountains, but for fans of the Chris Hillman/Desert Rose Band school of harmony-rich country pop, Blue Frontier is for you." Entertainment Weekly reviewer Alanna Nash rated the album "C−", writing that "despite their gorgeous vocal blend, the Remingtons have surprisingly little to say... aside from 'Two-Timin’ Me,' a pleasant enough piece of lightweight R&B, and 'A Long Time Ago,' the saga of a sadder-but-wiser lad who opted for fame and fortune over true love, the Remingtons seem content simply to skate on the surface of romantic emotion, perfecting a sugary brand of bubble-gum country."

Track listing

Personnel
Compiled from Blue Frontier liner notes.

The Remingtons

 Jimmy Griffin - lead vocals (track 3, 7, 8); background vocals (all other tracks); high-strung guitar (track 1); acoustic guitar (track 4, 5, 8, 9, 10)
 Richard Mainegra - lead vocals (tracks 2, 4, 5, 6), background vocals (all other tracks); acoustic guitar (track 1, 3, 7, 9, 10); acoustic guitar solo (track 3, 4, 9, 10)
 Rick Yancey - lead vocals (track 1, 9, 10); background vocals (all other tracks); acoustic guitar (track 5); acoustic guitar solo (track 8)

 Additional musicians
 Larry Byrom - electric guitar (all tracks except 1)
 Paul Franklin - pedal steel guitar (track 1, 3, 4, 5, 7, 9, 10), Pedabro (track 2)
 Bill C. Graham - fiddle (track 4)
 Rob Hajacos - fiddle (track 2, 4, 9, 10)
 John L. Hug - acoustic guitar (track 3, 4, 5, 6, 9)
 Bernie Leadon - acoustic guitar (all tracks), mandolin (track 2, 10), banjo (track 2, 6), tiple (track 2)
 Larry Michael Lee - percussion (track 1)
 Josh Leo - 12-string guitar (track 1), high-strung guitar (track 2, 6, 7), electric guitar (track 5, 10), Leslie guitar (track 8)
 Vince Melamed - organ (track 5, 6, 7, 8)
 Michael Rhodes - bass guitar (track 3, 4, 5, 6, 9)
 Harry Stinson - drums (track 3, 4, 5, 6, 9)
 Billy Thomas - drums (track 1, 2, 7, 8, 10)
 Biff Watson - high-strung guitar (track 1, 8, 10), acoustic guitar (track 2, 7), celesta (track 7)
 Glenn Worf - bass guitar (track 1, 2, 7, 8, 10)

Technical
 Joe Bogan - recording
 Jeff Giedt - recording
 Larry Michael Lee - production
 Josh Leo - production
 Steve Marcantonio - recording, mixing
 Denny Purcell - mastering

Chart performance

References

1992 debut albums
Albums produced by Josh Leo
BNA Records albums
The Remingtons albums